Eurhynchothrips is a genus of thrips in the family Phlaeothripidae.

Species
 Eurhynchothrips bipunctatus
 Eurhynchothrips convergens
 Eurhynchothrips flavicornis
 Eurhynchothrips messuicola
 Eurhynchothrips ordinarius

References

Phlaeothripidae
Thrips
Thrips genera